Picote Dam is a concrete arch dam on the Douro, located in the municipality Miranda do Douro, in Bragança District, Portugal.

Construction of the dam began in 1953. The dam was completed in 1958. It is owned by Companhia Portuguesa de Produção de Electricidade (CPPE). Picote Dam was the first dam constructed by Portugal on the Douro.

Dam
Picote Dam is a 100 m tall (height above foundation) and 139 m long arch dam with a crest altitude of 480 m. The volume of the dam is 205,000 m³. The spillway is located on its crest and is controlled by four tainter gates.

Reservoir
At full reservoir level of 471 m (maximum flood level of 478 m) the reservoir of the dam has a surface area of 2.44 km² and its total capacity is 63 mio. m³ (active capacity 13.43 mio. m³).

Power plant Picote I
The power plant Picote I is a run-of-the-river hydroelectric power station with a nameplate capacity of 195 MW. Its average annual generation is 868,6 (838, 941, or 1,038) GWh. The power station contains three 65 MW Francis turbine-generators in an underground powerhouse.

The minimum hydraulic head is 63 m, the maximum 74 m. Maximum flow per turbine is 117 m³/s.

The plant is owned by CPPE, but operated by EDP.

Power plant Picote II
In March 2007 construction began on the Picote II hydroelectric power plant. In December 2011 work on an additional underground powerhouse was completed and a further turbine with 246 MW went online. Its average annual generation is 244 GWh.

The plant is owned by CPPE, but operated by EDP.

See also

 List of power stations in Portugal

References

Dams in Portugal
Hydroelectric power stations in Portugal
Arch dams
Dams completed in 1958
Energy infrastructure completed in 1958
1958 establishments in Portugal
Buildings and structures in Bragança District
Underground power stations
Dams on the Douro River